German submarine U-369 was a Type VIIC U-boat of Nazi Germany's Kriegsmarine during World War II.

She carried out no patrols. She did not sink or damage any ships.

She was sunk after Germany's surrender as part of Operation Deadlight on 30 November 1945.

Design
German Type VIIC submarines were preceded by the shorter Type VIIB submarines. U-369 had a displacement of  when at the surface and  while submerged. She had two shafts and two  propellers.

U-369 was fitted with five  torpedo tubes (four fitted at the bow and one at the stern), fourteen torpedoes, one  SK C/35 naval gun, 220 rounds, and two twin  C/30 anti-aircraft guns. The boat had a complement of between forty-four and sixty.

Service history
The submarine was laid down on 6 October 1942 at the Flensburger Schiffbau-Gesellschaft yard at Flensburg as yard number 492, launched on 17 August 1943 and commissioned on 15 October under the command of Kapitänleutnant Ludwig Schaafhausen. She served with the 22nd U-boat Flotilla from 15 October 1943 and the 11th flotilla from 1 March 1945.

Fate
U-369 surrendered at Kristiansand-Sud in Norway on 5 May 1945. She was transferred to Scapa Flow in Scotland for Operation Deadlight on 29 May. She was sunk on 30 November.

References

Bibliography

External links

German Type VIIC submarines
U-boats commissioned in 1943
U-boats sunk in 1945
1943 ships
Ships built in Flensburg
Operation Deadlight
World War II submarines of Germany
Maritime incidents in November 1945